Samuel John Bell (born 23 May 2002) is an English professional footballer who plays as a forward for Bristol City.

Career
A youth product of Bristol City, Bell joined Clevedon Town on loan in April 2019, where he scored three goals in four matches. Bell joined Yate Town on loan on 20 December 2019.

On 5 December 2020, Bell made his professional debut with Bristol City in a 1–0 Championship loss to Birmingham City.

On 22 November 2021, Bell signed for Grimsby Town on a short-term loan, linking him up with Robins team mate Ryley Towler.

He began to break into the Bristol City first team in December 2022, and scored his first Bristol City goal in the 2022-23 FA Cup third round replay against Swansea City, scoring an extra time winner. He followed this up with a brace against West Bromwich Albion in the 4th round.

Personal life
Bell is the son of the retired English footballer Micky Bell, who also represented Bristol City from 1997 to 2005.

Career statistics

References

External links
 

2002 births
Living people
Footballers from Bristol
English footballers
Association football forwards
Bristol City F.C. players
Yate Town F.C. players
Grimsby Town F.C. players
English Football League players
Southern Football League players
National League (English football) players